The Colonial Bank was a bank in the British territories of the West Indies during the colonial era. The bank was established in 1836 and had opened offices in most of the territories by 1837.

References

Banks established in 1836
Banks of the Caribbean
1836 establishments in the British Empire